The 2023 USA Outdoor Track and Field Championships are scheduled to be held in Hayward Field in Eugene, Oregon from July 6-9, 2023. They will serve as USA Track & Field's (USATF) national championships in track and field for the United States. The 2023 USATF Junior Championships are also scheduled to be held at Hayward Field in Eugene from July 7-9, 2023. The results of the event will determine qualification for the 2023 Pan American U20 Athletics Championships and 2023 NACAC U18 and U23 Championships in Athletics.

The results of the event will determine qualification for the 2023 World Athletics Championships, held in Budapest, and the 2023 Pan American Games, held in Santiago, Chile. Provided they have achieved the World standard or are in the World Athletics ranking quota, the top three athletes in each event will gain a place on the Team USA World team. In the event that a leading athlete does not hold the standard, or an athlete withdraws, the next highest finishing athlete with the standard will be selected instead. USATF is expected to announce their World Championship roster based on these guidelines in July 2023.

Men's results

Men track events

Men field events

Women's results
Key:

Women track events

Women field events

Notes

Schedule

Automatic selections
The following are eligible for automatic selection by Team USA to 2023 World Athletics Championships and 2023 Pan American Games.

2022 World Athletics Championships Champions
 100 metres Fred Kerley
 200 metres Noah Lyles
 400 metres Michael Norman
 110 metres hurdles Grant Holloway
 Shot put Ryan Crouser
 800 metres Athing Mu
 400 metres hurdles Sydney McLaughlin-Levrone
 Pole vault Katie Nageotte
 Shot put Chase Ealey
 Hammer throw Brooke Andersen

2022 Diamond League Champions
 Shot put Ryan Crouser
 100 meters Trayvon Bromell
 200 meters Noah Lyles
 110 metres hurdles Grant Holloway
 Shot put Chase Ealey
 Discus throw Valarie Allman
 Javelin throw Kara Winger

2022 World Athletics Combined Events Challenge Winner

2022 NACAC Championships winner
 800 metres Jonah Koech
 1500 metres Eric Holt
 5000 metres Woody Kincaid
 10,000 metres Sean McGorty
 110 metres hurdles Freddie Crittenden
 3000 metres steeplechase Evan Jager
 Long jump William Williams
 Triple jump Chris Benard
 Shot put Roger Steen
 Hammer throw Rudy Winkler
 Javelin throw	Curtis Thompson
 200 m Brittany Brown
 800 metres Ajee Wilson
 1500 metres Heather MacLean
 5000 metres Natosha Rogers
 10,000 metres Stephanie Bruce
 100 metres hurdles Alaysha Johnson
 3000 metres steeplechase Gabrielle Jennings
 High jump Vashti Cunningham
 Pole vault Alina McDonald
 Long jump Quanesha Burks
 Discus throw Laulauga Tausaga-Collins
 Hammer throw Janee' Kassanavoid
 Javelin throw Kara Winger

2023 USA Qualification Standards 
All qualifying performances for the Championships must be attained during the following time periods:
 10,000 meters, 20km Race Walk, & Combined Events: Monday, January 31, 2022 – Sunday, June 25, 2023
 All other events: Thursday, June 23, 2022 – Sunday, June 25, 2023

References

External links
 Hayward Field to host 2023 USATF Outdoor Championships MSN
 Eugene’s Hayward Field to host 2023 USA Track & Field Outdoor Championships The Oregonian
 Melville wins battle with fellow Olympian to take 35 km Race Walk title San Diego Union Tribune

USA Outdoor Track and Field Championships
US Olympic Trials
Track, Outdoor
USA Outdoor Track and Field Championships